The Great Emperor in Song Dynasty is a 2015 Chinese historical TV series directed by Gao Xixi, starring Chen Jianbin as Emperor Taizu of Song (Zhao Kuangyin) who founded the Song dynasty and reunified most of China proper.

The series was filmed at the Hengdian World Studios in 2012, but was not broadcast until 2015.

International broadcast
China - 10 August 2015, Chongqing Television/Jilin Television
Malaysia - 24 January 2016, Astro Quan Jia HD
South Korea - 20 May 2016, AsiaUHD
Taiwan - November 2016, Taiwan Television/Videoland Television

Cast

Chen Jianbin as Zhao Kuangyin
Yin Tao as Wang Yuehong
Li Yiying as young Wang Yuehong
Yin Tao also as Xu Rui
Shao Feng as Zhao Kuangyi
Qiu Shuang as young Zhao Kuangyi
Wang Huichun as Zhao Pu
Tian Ling as Du Shenping
Zhou Yang as Zhao Jingniang
Li Jianxin as Wang Ji'en
Li Wenwen as Fu Rong
Kang Kai as Zhang Qiong
Ji Chenmu as Fu Zhaoshou
Cao Weiyu as Shen Yilun
Wang Guan as He Shuya
Sun Jia as Xue Fengjiao
Li Jianyi as Chen Tuan
Liu Yajin as Meng Chang
Yan Pei as Wei Renpu
Xu Maomao as Gao Huaide
Lu Yong as Guo Wei
Li Hongrui as Li Chongjin
Cheng Xiangyin as Wang Rao
Sun Ning as Tao Gu
Song Laiyun as Han Tong
Li Yuxuan as Han Gui
Wang Dongming as Liu Chengyou
Li Yansheng as Liu Wensou
Ye Peng as Zheng En
Bi Haifeng as Zhao Hongyin
Lu Yujie as Fu Yanqing
Huo Qing as Jia Yan
Fan Ying as Lu Duoxun
Wang Zitong as Song Huayang
Xu Yuan as young Song Huayang
Gao Baosong as An Zhong
Wang Ming as Yingying
Zhang Jinyu as Wanqing
Zuo Yidan as Bailing
Liu Jing as Xiaodie
Wang Tongyu as Liu Yao
Fan Yulin as Chen Kai
Zhang Xinhua as Cheng Dexuan
Shang Yue as Niu Deshui
Zhong Minghe as Su Fengji
Xu Ge as Li Chongju
Yang Guang as Li Yun
Zhang Yaxi as Li Yu
Li Yuemin as Lei Dexiang
Ji Chonggong as Wei Rong
Xu Wanqiu as Liu Chengyou's concubine
An Ruiyun as Du Shenzhao
Fan Guolun as Du Zhu
Bai Jincheng as Doctor Fan
Wu Xiaodong as Chai Rong
Yang Sichen as Chai Zongxun
Tian Yuqing as Fu Ming
Guo Wenxue as Lü Yuqing
Ma Zengqin as Lady He
Yang Kaiwen as An Yougui
Liu Yuchen as Zhao Dezhao
Huang Yujialin as young Zhao Dezhao
Zhang Yuzhu as elderly clansman
Hu Jingpei as Ge Ba
Cao Yuqing as Ge Ba's mother
Tang Qirong as Doctor Hong
Wang Hui as Huilin
Yang Zhe as Zhang Yongde
Jia Jungang as Li Hao
Li Yufu as Lin Renzhao
Yu Kuai as Li Jixun
Zou Dongxiao as Liu Jiyuan
Cheng Yuxuan as Liu Chongjun
Dai Ming as Shi Hongzhao
Yang Shu as Li Shouzhen
Luo Ting as Yang Bin
Guo Junke as Meng Xuanzhe
Qiu Yunhe as Liu Chang
Yin Xiaotian as Li Cunxu (cameo)
Yu Conghai as Li Siyuan (cameo)
Zhang Chenghao as Emperor Jingzong of Liao

2015 Chinese television series debuts
2015 Chinese television series endings
Chinese historical television series
Television series set in the Five Dynasties and Ten Kingdoms period
Mandarin-language television shows
Television series set in the Northern Song
Television shows set in Kaifeng